Li Li may refer to:

Li Li (badminton) (born 1983), Chinese badminton player
Li Li (Water Margin), fictional character in the Water Margin
Muzi Mei (born 1978), real name Li Li, Chinese blogger
Li Li (gymnast) (born 1975), Chinese artistic gymnast
Li Li (poet and translator), poet and translator
Li Li (table tennis), table tennis player from China
Li Li (tennis) (born 1976), Chinese tennis player
Li Li (politician) (1908–2006), People's Republic of China politician
Li Li, daughter of Li Yuru, the Peking opera star
Li Li, professor of hydrology at Penn State University

See also 
Lili (disambiguation)